Riaz Amanat Ali Virk (born 1 January 1962) is a Pakistani politician who had been a Member of the Provincial Assembly of the Punjab, from May 2013 to May 2018.

Early life
Virk was born on 1 January 1962 in Nowshera Virkan Tehsil.

Political career

She was elected to the Provincial Assembly of the Punjab as a candidate for Pakistan Muslim League (N) (PML-N) for Constituency PP-101 (Gujranwala-XI) in 2013 Pakistani general election. She received 24,430 votes and defeated an independent candidate, Khalid Pervaz Virk.

References

Living people
Punjab MPAs 2013–2018
1962 births
Pakistan Muslim League (N) politicians
21st-century Pakistani women politicians